Ghost Sonata can refer to: 

 The Ghost Sonata (Spöksonaten), a play by August Strindberg produced in 1908
 The Ghost Sonata, Die Gespenstersonate, a 1984 opera based on the play
 The Ghost Sonata (album), a 1991 album by Tuxedomoon
 "The Ghost Sonata" (Pretty Little Liars: The Perfectionists), a 2019 television episode